Elliot Jaffee was an American television series, which aired 1931 to 1932 on experimental television station W2XAB (now WCBS-TV). Featuring the tenor of the same name, it was a live music series on mechanical television. Jaffee was also a radio performer during the early 1930s. None of the episodes still exist, as methods to record live television were not developed until late 1947. The series aired in a 15-minute time-slot.

Scheduling
Aired on Saturdays, it typically aired at 8:00PM, and was followed by a segment with Lilyan Crossman.

References

External links
Elliot Jaffee on IMDb

1931 American television series debuts
1932 American television series endings
1930s American television series
American live television series
Lost television shows
American music television series
Black-and-white American television shows
Local music television shows in the United States